The 8th World Cup season began in December 1973 and concluded in March 1974. Piero Gros of Italy won the overall title, denying the runner-up, countryman Gustav Thöni, a fourth straight overall title. Annemarie Pröll of Austria won the women's overall title, her fourth of five consecutive.

The break in the schedule was for the 1974 World Championships, held February 3–10 at St. Moritz, Switzerland.

Due to the growth of the professional skiing tour (especially in the United States), which now featured World Cup winning stars such as Jean-Claude Killy, Karl Schranz, Patrick Russel, and Jean-Noël Augert,  no World Cup races were held in North America for the first time in its history; the next time this happened was during the COVID-19 pandemic in the 2020-21 season.  Instead, the entire 1973–74 season took place in Europe.

Calendar

Men

Ladies

Men

Overall 

The Men's Overall World Cup 1973/74 was divided into three periods. From the first 6 races the best 4 results count, from the next 10 races (Race No 7 to No 16) the best 6 results count and from the last 5 races the best 3 results count. Four racers had a point deduction.

Downhill 

In Men's Downhill World Cup 1973/74 the best 5 results count. Roland Collombin won four races in a row.

Giant Slalom 

In Men's Giant Slalom World Cup 1973/74 the best 5 results count.

Slalom 

In Men's Slalom World Cup 1973/74 the best 5 results count. No racer had a point deduction. Gustav Thöni won the cup with only four results.

Ladies

Overall 

The Women's Overall World Cup 1973/74 was most likely also divided into periods.

Downhill 

In Women's Downhill World Cup 1973/74 all 5 results count. No racer had a point deduction. After her 8 victories of the previous season Annemarie Pröll reached a total of 11 downhill victories in a row, still records for female single discipline serial winner and downhill serial winner (Ingemar Stenmark later won 14 giant slaloms in a row).

Giant Slalom 

In Women's Giant Slalom World Cup 1973/74 the best 5 results count. Hanni Wenzel won the cup with only four results. In 6 races there were 5 different winners.

Slalom 

In Women's Slalom World Cup 1973/74 the best 5 results count. Christa Zechmeister won four races in a row. All 6 races were won by athletes from West Germany!

Nations Cup

Overall

Men

Ladies

References

External links
FIS-ski.com - World Cup standings - 1974

FIS Alpine Ski World Cup
Alpine Skiing World Cup, 1974
Alpine Skiing World Cup, 1974